Save the Lady is a 1982 Australian children's film that was made in Tasmania.

The film was financed by the Tasmanian Film Corporation which was sold off to private investors in the 1980s. This has made copies of the film hard to obtain.

References

External links
Save the Lady at IMDb
Save the Lady at Oz Movies

Australian children's films
1980s English-language films
1980s Australian films